Posi music (in American English, pronounced pah-zee) has been around since the 1940s, though only recently has a definitive label been applied to music in this genre. Short for positive music, posi music is categorized by its intention to have a positive effect on the listener. Musicians who write and perform posi music profess a desire for their music to unite and inspire their audience and make them feel better.
An example is "Accentuate The Positive" written by Johnny Mercer and made famous by Bing Crosby.  The song defined the concept that there is polarity between being positive or being negative, specifically noting there is also no neutral as in "no more Mister In-Between".

This concept has been expanded by groups promoting the education of posi music, such as the Positive Music Association, emPower Music and Arts and the Positive Music Imperative.  This concept of Positive Music and Negative music has also been identified in the book called A New Earth, by Eckhart Tolle

Origins 
Early posi music certainly had some roots in traditional folk music, in the genre labeled protest music.  While much of protest music would not fit into the simple definition of posi music, a subjective opinion could easily include songs like  "We Shall Overcome" by Pete Seeger or "If I Had A Hammer" performed by Peter Paul and Mary.

Deeper roots were nourished by New Thought musicians and posi music finally emerged as a fully defined concept when pioneers of the genre, Karl Anthony, Shanti Norman, Charley Thweatt, and Leroy White created music that was not focused on theology, but instead on more inclusive themes. Unlike gospel and contemporary worship music, posi music's lyrics are less specifically spiritual. By focusing on the human spirit and world community, posi music embraces musicians from any religion. As the genre has evolved, it has been adopted by artists following many different spiritual paths ranging from New Thought, Agapism, Judaism, Christian Science and Catholicism to Buddhism, Pantheism and Seicho-no-Ie.

Increasingly, there are groups of posi music artists who are dedicating most, if not all, of their music specifically to uplifting or motivational topics. As favor for the genre has grown, entire record labels have been dedicated to publication of posi music. As always, a selection of mainstream pop music would also fit into the genre of posi music, touching on major themes such as friendship and gratitude. Examples would be the hit songs "You've Got A Friend" by James Taylor, "Bridge Over Troubled Water" by Simon and Garfunkel, and "Thank You For Being A Friend" by Andrew Gold. Of course, countless others would fit the bill; gratitude songs could once again go all the way back to Bob Hope's "Thanks for the Memory," right up to songs simply entitled "Thank You" by Dido or Natalie Merchant.

Style 
Posi music is described as being upbeat and uplifting music. Usually it centers around the lyrics rather than the music itself. Often it is affirmational, though sometimes it is a call directing the listener to make changes to how they live. Posi music can be spiritual, but it is not specifically religious in nature. This is by design, as posi music is meant to be enjoyed by people of all faiths.

Uses 
Posi music can be used in many settings beyond spiritual communities. Posi music is marketed for use in retreats, workshops, fitness centers, counseling centers, therapy, nursing homes and hospitals. The themes in posi music are ideal for programs such as Arts in Medicine, where music is used to promote healing.

Uses of posi music have expanded to include motivational music for work-outs and companies like Amway have used motivational music to inspire their distributors.  In 2008 Barack Obama used posi music in his Yes We Can campaign by enlisting artist support like India.Arie with songs like "There's Hope" and "I Gotta Feeling" by The Black Eyed Peas.

Events 
The Posi Music Festival for 2018 will be March 28-April 1, 2019 in Tampa, Florida, culminating with emPower Music & Arts' Posi Awards, an award ceremony recognizing artists producing outstanding Posi Music from the previous year. Tickets to hear a collection of artists (Mega Concert) may be available to the public.

May 1 is Global Love Day, a celebration started by The Love Foundation. Posi Music plays a part as many Posi musicians sponsor the event.

November has been declared Posi Music Month by many notable musicians in the genre. Fans are encouraged to "fast" from negative music and go on a "diet" of positive music for the month.

PosiPalooza is a national concert series from emPower Music & Arts. Traveling the country, Posi Award nominated musicians play venues ranging from churches to stadiums.

Professional organizations 
 emPower Music & Arts – social network connecting musicians and fans and sponsor of the Annual Posi Awards
 Positive Music Association (PMA) – promoting Posi Music and the musicians who create it
 Harmonizing with Humanity – linking fans to the work of great Posi musicians
 Arts In Medicine – integrating Posi Music and the arts with medical care

References 

 Lysa Allman-Baldwin, Positive music artists share “Posi Music” in New Thought centers: Unity.org
 E. W. Murtfeldt, "How Music Heals the Sick," Popular Science, 131(32–33)
 Eckhart Tolle, "A New Earth," Penguin Books, 2005

Music genres
Music therapy
New Thought mass media